Broad Clyst railway station is a disused railway station on the West of England Main Line which served the nearby village of Broadclyst from 1860 until its closure in 1966.

History 
Constructed by the London and South Western Railway to the Gothic designs of Sir William Tite, Broad Clyst station was actually more than a mile away from the small village of Broadclyst from which it was to draw most of its traffic. The naming of the station proved to be a source of controversy with the railway company preferring "Broad Clyst" over the Post Office's insistence that a single word be used. The station attracted residential development in the immediate area and even today the area around the former station is known as Broadclyst Station.

The station saw little change during its 106-year life, it had two short platforms - the Up one was capable of accommodating four carriages and the Down one only three; they were never extended as the station only served local trains. The station was lit by oil lamps until its closure. A small Chief Engineers' depot was located on the Up side and this was extended in 1929 with the laying of additional sidings. At the depot was based a small departmental engine used for shunting operations.

The station saw mainly passenger traffic and goods traffic was fairly light, particularly as there was no resident coal merchant. Nevertheless, from the early 1960s a local manufacturer of three-wheel invalid cars began regularly sending his goods by rail. However, the decision was taken in 1963 to close the engineers' depot and, in 1965, to concentrate goods traffic on Exeter. At the same time, the Broad Clyst station itself was put forward for closure as part of the package of economies proposed by the Beeching Report. Goods traffic ceased in 1965, with passenger traffic ending the following year.

The station today 

The former station building and goods shed remain in commercial use on the Down side. The station building was completely renovated in 2006.

References 

Former London and South Western Railway stations
Disused railway stations in Devon
Railway stations in Great Britain opened in 1860
Railway stations in Great Britain closed in 1966
Beeching closures in England